Izra is a lake of Slovakia.

Lakes of Slovakia